Muhammad Jawadullah (born 12 March 1999) is a Pakistani-born cricketer who plays for the United Arab Emirates national cricket team. He is a left-arm fast bowler. He made his Twenty20 International (T20I) debut for the United Arab Emirates against Afghanistan on 16 February 2023.

Prior to making his debut for UAE, Jawadullah represented the Sharjah Warriors in the inaugural 2022–23 International League T20.

Personal life
Jawadullah grew up near Mardan in Khyber Pakhtunkhwa, Pakistan. He moved to the UAE in 2019 to work as an electrician at a shooting club in Al Ain.

References

External links
 

1999 births
Living people
Pakistani cricketers
United Arab Emirates Twenty20 International cricketers
Pakistani expatriate sportspeople in the United Arab Emirates
People from Mardan District